The 1942 All-Ireland Senior Football Championship was the 56th staging of Ireland's premier Gaelic football knock-out competition. Kerry entered the championship as the defending champions, however, they were defeated by Galway in the All-Ireland semi-final.

Munster Championship format change

Normal system in place but Limerick still refuse to take part for 1 more year.

Results

Connacht Senior Football Championship

Leinster Senior Football Championship

Munster Senior Football Championship

Ulster Senior Football Championship

An objection was made and a replay ordered.

All-Ireland Senior Football Championship

Championship statistics

Miscellaneous

 The All Ireland final between Galway and Dublin gave Dublin won their first All Ireland title since 1923, ending their longest drought of 19 years. They were the first champions from Leinster since Kildare in 1928. Galway lost their third All Ireland final in a row.

References